Dean O'Brien and Ruan Roelofse were the defending champions but lost in the first round to Quentin Halys and Stefan Kozlov.

Matt Reid and John-Patrick Smith won the title after defeating Liam Broady and Guilherme Clezar 6–4, 6–2 in the final.

Seeds

Draw

References
 Main Draw
 Qualifying Draw

Levene Gouldin and Thompson Tennis Challenger – Doubles
2016 Doubles
2016 Levene Gouldin & Thompson Tennis Challenger